The SNCB Class 55 is a NMBS/SNCB diesel locomotive.

Six of these locomotives (5501, 5506, 5509, 5511, 5512 and 5514) are outfitted with TVM 430 signaling and a Scharfenberg coupler. This is for hauling broken-down or unpowered TGVs on line 1.  They display a horizontal red band and the letters "TVM". Some locomotives are owned and used by the Société Nationale des Chemins de Fer Luxembourgeois as CFL Class 1800.

References

External links 
 HLD 55
 Photos on Railfaneurope.net

55
Co′Co′ locomotives
Diesel-electric locomotives of Belgium
Railway locomotives introduced in 1961
La Brugeoise et Nivelles locomotives
Standard gauge locomotives of Belgium
Standard gauge locomotives of Luxembourg